Bou Bernous is a village in the commune of Oum El Assel, in Tindouf Province, Algeria, located in a remote part of the Sahara Desert. Bou Bernous is notable for having the highest officially recorded average high temperature in the world, at 47 °C or 116.6 °F.

References

Neighbouring towns and cities

Populated places in Tindouf Province